The James Madison Program in American Ideals and Institutions, often called simply the Madison Program, is a scholarly institute within the Department of Politics at Princeton University that is "dedicated to exploring enduring questions of American constitutional law and Western political thought." The Madison Program was founded in 2000 and is directed by Robert P. George, the McCormick Professor of Jurisprudence at Princeton University.

History

The Madison Program was founded in the summer of 2000 via a charter with the Department of Politics at Princeton University. Early funders included Steve Forbes, the John M. Olin Foundation, and the Bradley Foundation.  Early speakers included liberal scholars such as James E. Fleming of Fordham University, Stanley N. Katz of Princeton University and more conservative ones, including Robert Bork, Christopher DeMuth, then-president of the American Enterprise Institute, Lynne Cheney, chairwoman of the National Endowment for the Humanities in the first Bush administration, and William Kristol, then-editor of The Weekly Standard. 

The Program celebrated its 10th anniversary in 2010 with a lecture from columnist George Will.  Summer 2020 marked the 20th anniversary of the Program.

Academic programs

Politics departmental track

The Program sponsors the track in "American Ideas and Institutions" for undergraduates concentrating in Politics at Princeton. The track includes courses from American politics, political theory, and public law to allow students to "further and demonstrate their understandings of the three branches of the federal government and the values, ideas, and theories that underlie them and are animated by their workings."

Undergraduate Fellows Forum

The Program is host to the Undergraduate Fellows Forum, where Princeton undergraduates engage with fellow students interested in American constitutionalism and American political institutions. Undergraduate Fellows have founded such programs at Princeton as a podcast called "Woke Wednesdays" and the third undergraduate chapter of the Federalist Society.

James Madison Society

The Madison Program is host to several Visiting and Postdoctoral Fellows at Princeton every year and past Visiting Fellows become part of the James Madison Society. The members of the Society are interested in intellectual dialogue across partisan lines and span the ideological spectrum.

Public initiatives

Statements

"Truth Seeking, Democracy, and Freedom of Thought and Expression"

On March 14, 2017, Robert P. George and Cornel West issued a joint statement via the Madison Program to encourage citizens to engage with people of opposing views. The statement was opened to signatories from the public; as of March 2019, there were more than 4,000 signatories.

"Think for Yourself"

On August 29, 2017, the Madison Program issued a joint statement entitled "Some Thoughts and Advice for Our Students and All Students" in which Princeton, Harvard, and Yale University professors encouraged students entering college to avoid becoming "trapped in an echo chamber" by "taking the trouble to learn and honestly consider the strongest arguments to be advanced on both or all sides of questions—including arguments for positions that others revile and want to stigmatize and against positions others seek to immunize from critical scrutiny."

Initiative on Politics and Statesmanship 
In 2019, the James Madison Program established its Initiative on Politics and Statesmanship. The Initiative is directed by Allen C. Guelzo, and seeks to "discern, understand and critique the substance and style of statesmanship in modern democratic societies; to encourage the study of statesmanship in the Anglo-American political tradition, as it was inherited from the Greek and Roman classical past, through the Glorious Revolution, the American Revolution, the Civil War and the World Wars, to the present; and to present the findings of leading scholars of this statesmanship in public forums which will assist the general public in understanding and supporting examples of statesmanlike behavior in modern political environments." The Initiative hosts public events, seminars, and a summer program for undergraduate students on the "Theory and Practice of Statesmanship."

Initiative on Freedom of Thought, inquiry, and Expression 
In 2022, the James Madison Program established its Initiative on Freedom of Thought, Inquiry, and Expression (known colloquially as the "Free Speech Initiative"). The Initiative is directed by Princeton University professors Keith E. Whittington and Bernard Haykel. The Free Speech Initiative was established to "promote, explain, and defend free speech and academic freedom. Through events, seminars, and other programming, the James Madison Free Speech Initiative creates opportunities for the Princeton community—faculty, students, staff, and the public—to learn how and why freedom of thought and inquiry is essential to the health of universities and free societies."

Reception

According to Jane Mayer, writing in The Chronicle of Higher Education, the Madison Program was founded with funds from the conservative John M. Olin Foundation.  Director Robert P. George claims the Program is not conservative, but rather "seeks to bring competing points of view together to lift the intellectual debate on campus." 

The Program has been used as a template for similar institutions at Georgetown, New York University, and Williams College. It has been praised for its ability to enable cooperation between Catholic and Evangelical Christians.

References

External links

Princeton University
2000 establishments in New Jersey
Educational institutions established in 2000
Organizations established in 2000
John M. Olin Foundation